CFDM-FM (105.7 FM) is a community radio station serving the Flying Dust First Nation and the adjacent town of Meadow Lake, Saskatchewan, Canada.

CFDM radio began in the mid 1990s as a short broadcast (one to two hours each weekday) carried on the 105.7 FM frequency that had previously been used by MBC Radio's CJLR-FM. Since then the station has expanded to a week-long broadcast with live broadcast every weekday from 7 AM to 6 PM. CFDM Radio currently employs 4 people.

The CFDM-FM call sign was also used by an unrelated radio station in Drummondville (Quebec), which operated at 104.3 FM from 1970 to 1976.

References

External links
www.cfdm1057.com
CFDM Radio
 

Fdm
Meadow Lake, Saskatchewan
Year of establishment missing